"Internet Connection" is a song by British recording artist M.I.A. from the deluxe edition of her third studio album, Maya (2010). The track was written and produced by Maya "M.I.A." Arulpragasam, and Blaqstarr. Originally titled "I'm Down Like Your Internet Connection", the song was inspired by the issues M.I.A. had with her own Internet connection and a lengthy phone call with Verizon tech support. She eventually asked one of the workers to sing the lyrics down the phone, and used the recording in the final track. The song was released as the seventh and final single from the album, on 11 January 2011 as a digital download, under license to XL Recordings and exclusive license to Interscope in the USA. The EP featured remixes by artists including Flux Pavilion, Buraka Som Sistema, Huoratron and Tony Senghore.

Track listing
Digital download
 "Internet Connection"  – 5:06
 "Internet Connection"  – 5:31
 "Internet Connection"  – 7:05
 "Internet Connection"  – 7:16

Promo CD
 "Internet Connection" – 2:49
 "Internet Connection"  – 2:42

Release history

References

2010 songs
2011 singles
Electronic songs
M.I.A. (rapper) songs
Songs written by M.I.A. (rapper)
XL Recordings singles
N.E.E.T. Recordings singles
Songs written by Blaqstarr